Harley Samuel Pasternak is a Canadian personal trainer, motivational speaker, author and television host. Pasternak is known for working with many celebrity clients as a personal trainer. He is also known as one of the co-hosts of ABC's 2012 daytime talk show, The Revolution.

Early life
He was born in Toronto, Canada and later moved to Los Angeles to pursue a career in the fitness industry. Pasternak is Jewish and grew up in a 'typical Ashkenazi household'.

Pasternak graduated from York Mills Collegiate Institute and holds a honor degree in kinesiology from the University of Western Ontario and a master's degree in exercise physiology and nutritional sciences from the University of Toronto.

During his time at University of Toronto, Pasternak served as a nutrition and exercise scientist at Department of National Defence's Defence and Civil Institute for Environmental Medicine from 2005 to 2007. As a scientist, he focused on performance physiology and nutrition, with a specialty in caffeine and ephedrine. His work was published in the scientific journal Medicine & Science in Sports & Exercise in June 2003 and in The Canadian Journal of Sports Medicine. Pasternak is also certified by the American College of Sports Medicine and is an IDEA Master Trainer.

Notable clients
Pasternak has worked extensively with numerous celebrities.

In 1999, Dr. Marvin Waxman introduced Pasternak to producer Don Carmody, who hired Pasternak to work with Jim Caviezel and cast on his film Angel Eyes. After several subsequent films, Carmody hired Pasternak to train Halle Berry, Robert Downey Jr., and Penélope Cruz on the set of Gothika in Montreal. Berry suggested Pasternak move permanently from Toronto to Los Angeles to continue to work together, which he did.

In 2004, Berry played the title role in Catwoman, a role for which she trained exclusively with Pasternak. Pasternak appeared on The Oprah Winfrey Show to discuss Berry's training. After Winfrey suggested that he write a book about his program, he published 5-Factor Fitness: The Diet and Fitness Secret of Hollywood's A-List in 2005.

In 2022, Pasternak cut ties with rapper Kanye West after West posted a series of anti-Semitic messages on social media. Pasternak was West's former personal trainer, and said that West had a history of purportedly mental health issues. In response, West released a tweet which showed texts between the two, alleging that he had been "drugged out of [his] mind to make [him] a manageable well-behaved celebrity."

Television
In addition to his hosting on The Revolution, Pasternak has made appearances on American and Canadian morning daytime talk shows and news programs, along with serving as a guest judge on Germany's Next Topmodel and Canada's Next Top Model. Pasternak has been a frequent contributor on The Today Show as well as Good Morning America. Additionally, Pasternak co-stars in all three seasons of Khloe Kardashian's series Revenge Body.

Gym design 
In November 2018, Four Seasons Hotels and Resorts named Pasternak as their Global Fitness Ambassador. Since then, Pasternak has been responsible for the renovation and design of the gyms at Four Seasons Montreal, Four Seasons Anguilla, Four Seasons Philadelphia, and Four Seasons One Dalton Street in Boston.

Pasternak also designed the gym at the Viceroy Los Cabos and the Ritz Carlton Waikiki.

Legal issues 
In January 2012, Pasternak punched two men during a dispute over the use of a basketball court. He took a plea deal requiring anger management classes; a civil case was also filed.

Books
Pasternak has published four books, which have been listed on the New York Times bestselling list and been published in fourteen languages, with sales in 29 countries.
 5-Factor Fitness (Putnam Penguin)
 5-Factor Diet (Ballantine Books)
 5-Factor World Diet (Viking Books Canada)
 The Great Reset Diet (Rodale)
 The Body Reset Diet Cookbook (Viking Books Canada)

Filmography

Pasternak appears as himself doing a fitness routine with Megan Fox in the 2014 Teenage Mutant Ninja Turtles film. He also appeared as himself as Jessica Simpson's personal trainer in Private Valentine: Blonde & Dangerous in 2008.

Notes

References

1974 births
Living people
Canadian motivational speakers
University of Toronto alumni
University of Western Ontario alumni
Canadian exercise instructors
Spokespersons
Canadian nutritionists
Canadian exercise and fitness writers
Canadian sportswriters
Writers from Toronto
Canadian expatriates in the United States
Jewish Canadian journalists